Anacker is an unincorporated community located in the town of Fort Winnebago, Columbia County, Wisconsin, United States. The community was named after William Anacker, who served in the Union army in the American Civil War and was instrumental in the formation of the community.

Notes

Unincorporated communities in Columbia County, Wisconsin
Unincorporated communities in Wisconsin